Phlox stolonifera (creeping phlox or moss phlox) is a species of flowering plant in the family Polemoniaceae. It is a perennial herbaceous plant that is native to the eastern United States. It occurs in woodlands and stream banks in the vicinity of the Appalachian Mountains from Pennsylvania south to northern Georgia. Naturalized populations occur as far north as Québec, Canada.

They lack the central band of color that is present in the flowers of the related Phlox subulata.

The leaves are ovate.

The Latin specific epithet stolonifera means having stolons or rooting runners.

Characteristics 
The creeping phlox flowers typically have 5 petals, but there could also be 6 or 7 petals.  They range from pale blue and violet to purple and vibrant.

Gallery

References

External links

Discover Life, University of Georgia (includes distribution map)
North Carolina State University

stolonifera
Flora of the Eastern United States
Plants described in 1802